Events from the year 1948 in Denmark.

Incumbents
 Monarch – Frederick IX
 Prime minister – Hans Hedtoft

Events

Sports

Badminton
 36 March  1948 All England Badminton Championships
 Jørn Skaarup wins gold in Men's Single
 Kirsten Thorndahl wins gold in Women's Single
 Preben Dabelsteen ansd Børge Frederiksen win gold in Men's Double
 Tonny Ahm and Kirsten Thorndahl win gold in Women's Double* Jørn Skaarup and Kirsten Thorndahl win gold in Mixed Double
 22 April – Hvidovre Badminton Club is founded.

Football
 KB wins the 1947–48 Danish 1st Division. It is their ninth Danish football championship.

Births
 27 January – Harriet Bjerrum Nielsen, philologist and gender studies scholar
 12 March – Ole Thestrup, actor (died 2018)
 2 April – Roald Als, cartoonist and writer
 16 May – Jesper Christensen, actor 
 8 October – Hans Engell, journalist, politician minister of justice
 22 October – Bo Holten, composer and conductor 
 9 November – Bille August, Oscar-winning film director
 7 December – Mads Vinding, jazz bassist

Deaths
 28 January – Peter Rochegune Munch, historian and politician, served in three governments between 1909 and 1940 (born 1870)
 7 February – Carl Andreas Koefoed, agronomist (born 1855)
 24 March – Vilhelm Arnesen, painter (born 1865)
 13 April – John Christmas Møller, politician, foreign minister (born 1894)
 24 May – Adolph Jensen, economist and statistician (born 1866)
 21 August – Ole Falkentorp, architect (born 1886)
 13 September – Henning Haslund-Christensen, travel writer and anthropologist (born 1896)
 4 October – Camillo Carlsen, composer (born 1876)
 1 December – Herman Vedel, painter and portraitist (born 1875)

References

 
Denmark
Years of the 20th century in Denmark
1940s in Denmark
1948 in Europe